Harvey Samuel Firestone Jr. (April 20, 1898 – June 1, 1973) was an American businessman. He was chairman of the board of the Firestone Tire and Rubber Company.

Biography
He was born on April 20, 1898, to Harvey Samuel Firestone and Idabelle Smith Firestone and educated at Asheville School in Asheville, North Carolina. He served as a naval aviator during World War I. After Harvey Jr. graduated from Princeton University in 1920, Harvey Sr. placed him in charge of his company's steel products division; Harvey Jr. took over the leadership of the company in 1941.

Firestone helped establish the company's supply and service stores, and guided its operations during World War II. He was also president of the Firestone Foundation.

Firestone married Elizabeth Parke Firestone in 1921. They had four children: Elizabeth, Anne, Martha, and Harvey Samuel III. Martha married William Clay Ford Sr. and was, as of his death in 2014, the owner of the Detroit Lions. Harvey III died in Havana in 1960. Harvey Jr. died on June 1, 1973

Liberia
During World War I, Britain and the Netherlands controlled 98% of the raw materials necessary for the production of rubber. After the Rubber Restriction Act was passed in Britain in 1922, the costs that the Firestone Company paid for its supplies rose. Starting in 1924, Firestone was assigned to travel worldwide in search of locations where the company could grow its own rubber. After visits to Asia and to Mexico, he settled on Liberia as the base for Firestone Plantations Company. The 12,000 Liberian employees were paid low wages, because, as former employee Arthur Hayman described, the Liberian government felt that "men with money in their pockets would eventually have demanded the ballot".

Legacy
He was inducted as a National Patron of Delta Omicron, an international professional music fraternity for his philanthropic efforts.

His grandson, William Clay Ford Jr., is the current Chairman of the Board of Directors of the Ford Motor Company.

See also

Ford family tree

References

Sources

External links

1898 births
1973 deaths
20th-century American businesspeople
United States Navy personnel of World War I
American people of Austrian descent
Henry Ford family
Firestone family
Princeton University alumni
United States Naval Aviators
Commanders Crosses of the Order of Merit of the Federal Republic of Germany